Dorikithe Dongalu is a 1965 Indian Telugu-language science fiction action film directed by P. Subrahmanyam. It stars N. T. Rama Rao and Jamuna. The music was composed by S. Rajeswara Rao. The film was produced by D. L. Narayana on the Chandamama Films banner.

Plot 
The film begins with antisocial elements continuing their run, and the crime rate increasing day by day. Police Commissioner Prabhakar (Gummadi) advocates for people to cooperate with the department. Here Sudarsanam (Rajanala), Dr. Giridhar (Satyanarayana), and Lawer Brahmayya (Allu Ramalingaiah), the most respected people in the society on behalf of the people, agree to do so. But actually, these are the real culprits who are behind the crimes and creating a lot of atrocities using their muscle and scientific powers.

Visweswarayya (Dhulipala) is an old scientist. The trio tries to bribe him and when he refuses, they throw acid into his eyes and also kidnap his younger daughter Anuradha (Jayanthi), who assists him. Sundaram (Kantha Rao) Prabhakar's second wife Santhamma's (Suyakantham) son is also a renowned scientist, the trio heir, and sends him abroad for higher studies. Now Prabhakar's first wife's fled son Nandan Rao (N. T. Rama Rao), and Visweswarayya's elder daughter Madhavi (Jamuna) arrive as C.I.D. officers in disguise of old people by the names Agneyam and Latha. The trio plans to blast an aircraft; they execute it through Sundaram, which is witnessed by Prabhakar's brother-in-law Rama Rao (Malladi) and family. So, they kill them, except for their daughter Karuna (Sarada), who is kidnapped.

On one side, Visweswarayya and Sundaram continue their experiments with new innovations like flying cars, the invisible man, Ray Guns, etc. On the other side, Nandan Rao and Madhavi are busy in their detection, and they also fall in love. Nandan Rao succeeds in finding the facts about the trio; he also learns that his brother Sundaram is also involved, which he reveals to his father and also his identity. Both of them plan a secret mission, to manipulate the trio to keep Prabhakar in their custody. At last, Nandan Rao catches all the criminals when Sundaram also realizes his mistake, blasts his laboratory, and dies. Finally, the movie ends with the Govt. of India awarding Nandan Rao and Madhavi.

Cast 
N. T. Rama Rao as Nandan Rao / Agneyam
Jamuna as Latha / Madhavi
Rajanala as Sudarsanam
Kanta Rao as Sundaram
V. Nagayya as Minister
Gummadi as Commissioner Prabhakar Rao
Dhulipala as Visweswarayya
Ramana Reddy as Anji
Satyanarayana as Dr. Gangadharam
Allu Ramalingaiah as Lawyer Brahmayya
Malladi as Rama Rao
Jagga Rao as Inspector Prakash
Suryakantham as Santhamma
Rajasree as Appalamma and Rosy (dual role)
Sarada as Karuna
Jayanthi as Anuradha

Soundtrack 

Music was composed by S. Rajeswara Rao.

References

External links 
 

1960s science fiction action films
Films scored by S. Rajeswara Rao
Indian science fiction action films
1960s Telugu-language films
Indian science fiction films